Centre-Avia Airlines (Авиакомпания "ЦЕНТР-АВИА") was an airline based in Moscow, Russia, operating domestic and international services. Its main base was Bykovo Airport, Moscow, from where it operated charter flights, plus, on working days, a scheduled flight from Moscow Domodedovo Airport to Nizhny Novgorod International Airport. In March 2007, the aircraft fleet of Centre-Avia consisted of four Yakovlev Yak-42.

History 
Centre-Avia was founded in 2000 and was owned by Bykovo Aircraft Repair Plant (29.4%), Bykovo Airport (20%), MRIK Investment (20%) and Resourcetrustbank (10.8%). In 2010, the company was liquidated.

References

External links 

  Centre-Avia official website

Companies based in Moscow
Airlines established in 2000
Airlines disestablished in 2010
Defunct airlines of Russia